Nongmeikapam Suresh Meitei (born 30 March 1994) is an Indian professional footballer who plays as a defender for I-League club RoundGlass Punjab.

Early life 
Suresh was born on 30 March 1994 in Indian state of Manipur.

Career

Army Red 
Suresh had featured for Army Red in the 2019 Durand Cup. He served as the captain of the club. Suresh played his first match against I-League side East Bengal on 3 August 2019. The match ended 2–0 in favour of East Bengal. Suresh played his second match against the reserve team of Indian Super League side Bengaluru FC on 5 August 2019. The match finished with the scoreline 1–1 draw. Suresh played his third match for the team against the reserve team of Indian Super League side Jamshedpur FC on 9 August 2019. Suresh scored a brace in the match. The game ended 2-2 after final whistle. Suresh played three matches for Army Red and scored 2 goals for the team.

Churchill Brothers

2019-20 
Suresh signed for I-League side Churchill Brothers on 2019. He featured for the club in 2019-20 I-League season. Suresh played his debut match on 26 January 2020 against Gokulam Kerala F.C. The match ended 1–0 in favour of Gokulam Kerala. Suresh again started in the next match against NEROCA FC on 2 February 2020. The match ended 4–1 with Churchill Brothers taking the victory. He played his third match against Chennai City FC on 9 February 2020. The match ended with scoreline 1–2 with Chennai City taking the victory. Suresh played his last match of the season against Kolkata giants East Bengal on 29 February 2019 where he started as a substitute for Glan Martins in the 66th minute of the game. Suresh was booked in the stoppage time. The match ended in a 1–1 draw. Suresh appeared in 4 matches in total for Churchill Brothers at the end of the season.

2020-21 
Suresh stayed at Churchill Brothers for the 2020-21 I-League season. Suresh started in the lineup in the clubs' first match of the season against Indian Arrows on 10 January 2021, which they ended up winning 2-5.

Career statistics

Club

References

External links 

 
 Suresh Meitei at All India Football Federation
 Suresh Meitei at Flashscore

1994 births
Living people
People from Manipur
Indian footballers
Churchill Brothers FC Goa players
Association football defenders
Footballers from Manipur
I-League players